The 1955–56 NHL season was the 39th season of the National Hockey League. Six teams each played 70 games. The Montreal Canadiens were the Stanley Cup champions as they beat the Detroit Red Wings four games to one in the best-of-seven final series.

League business

At a governors' meeting in December, a discussion took place concerning the uniforms worn by officials. It was contended that the present orange and black uniforms were confusing to players and fans, particularly when red uniforms are worn by either of the participating teams. Furthermore, it was pointed out that the existing uniforms showed up black on television. It was unanimously agreed that officials' uniforms should be changed to black and white vertical stripes. The black and white uniforms were first worn on December 29, 1955.

With Montreal frequently racking up two or three goals on any one power play, NHL President Clarence Campbell said he'd like the penalty rule revised to a penalized player returning to the ice when a power play goal is scored on a minor penalty. The Canadiens were the lone club to vote against the new legislation.

Regular season

The streak of seven straight seasons at the top of the NHL held by the Detroit Red Wings' dynasty came to an end as the Montreal Canadiens were tops. The Canadiens set a new record for wins in a season with 45. The Canadiens had a new coach, their one-time great former All-Star left-winger, Hector "Toe" Blake.

Dick Irvin, formerly the coach in Montreal, whom Habs' GM Frank Selke Sr. found a little truculent, took over as coach in Chicago, but could not get them out of the cellar, though they did improve. It was sort of a homecoming for Irvin as he started his coaching career with Chicago in 1930.

Highlights
When the Hawks went to the Montreal Forum on October 22, Irvin was presented with a set of silver flatware by William Northey, representing the Canadian Arena Company. In the game itself, rookie Henri Richard scored two goals as Montreal shut out Chicago 6–0.

On November 5, Jean Beliveau scored three goals in 44 seconds as Montreal beat Boston 4–3. The record for fastest hat trick still was held by Bill Mosienko with three goals in 21 seconds.

On December 29, officials debut the new "zebra" outfits in a game between the Canadiens and Maple Leafs.

On January 11, a crowd of 15,570 delighted fans at Madison Square Garden watched the Rangers trounce the Canadiens 6–1. Pete Conacher was a star for the Rangers with two goals. Lou Fontinato and Maurice Richard had a gala fight and Fontinato knocked out Richard with a punch that required several stitches above Richard's eye.

Montreal routed the Rangers 9–4 on February 18 as Beliveau had the hat trick and Richard two. The Rocket was incensed when referee Louis Maschio gave his brother a misconduct penalty and his teammates had to cool him off.

Beliveau set a record for goals by a center when he scored his 45th goal on March 15. Maurice Richard was hurt in this game when he fell over Hawk defenceman Pierre Pilote's skate and went headlong into the goal. He required stitches and was taken to hospital for X-rays. The Rocket was back in the lineup on St. Patrick's Day as the Canadiens trounced the Rangers 7–2 and Richard had the hat trick.

Rookie Glenn Hall had a fabulous year with 12 shutouts and a 2.11 goals against average for the ever-powerful Detroit Red Wings. He received the Calder Memorial Trophy over Henri "Pocket Rocket" Richard.

Final standings

Playoffs

Playoff bracket

Semifinals

(1) Montreal Canadiens vs. (3) New York Rangers

(2) Detroit Red Wings vs. (4) Toronto Maple Leafs

Stanley Cup Finals

Awards

All-Star teams

Player statistics

Scoring leaders
Note: GP = Games played, G = Goals, A = Assists, PTS = Points, PIM = Penalties in minutes

Source: NHL

Leading goaltenders

Note: GP = Games played; Min = Minutes played; GA = Goals against; GAA = Goals against average; W = Wins; L = Losses; T = Ties; SO = Shutouts

Coaches
Boston Bruins: Milt Schmidt
Chicago Black Hawks: Dick Irvin
Detroit Red Wings: Jimmy Skinner
Montreal Canadiens: Toe Blake
New York Rangers: Phil Watson
Toronto Maple Leafs: King Clancy

Debuts
The following is a list of players of note who played their first NHL game in 1955–56 (listed with their first team, asterisk(*) marks debut in playoffs):
Pierre Pilote, Chicago Black Hawks
Norm Ullman, Detroit Red Wings
Henri Richard, Montreal Canadiens
Claude Provost, Montreal Canadiens
Bob Turner, Montreal Canadiens
Bronco Horvath, New York Rangers
Andy Hebenton, New York Rangers
Jean-Guy Gendron, New York Rangers
Billy Harris, Toronto Maple Leafs

Last games
The following is a list of players of note that played their last game in the NHL in 1955–56 (listed with their last team):
Bill Quackenbush, Boston Bruins
Ed Sandford, Chicago Black Hawks
Bob Goldham, Detroit Red Wings
Emile "Butch" Bouchard, Montreal Canadiens
Don Raleigh, New York Rangers
Joe Klukay, Toronto Maple Leafs

See also
1955-56 NHL transactions
List of Stanley Cup champions
9th National Hockey League All-Star Game
National Hockey League All-Star Game
Ice hockey at the 1956 Winter Olympics
1955 in sports
1956 in sports

References

 
 
 
 

 

 
Notes

External links
Hockey Database
NHL.com

 
1955–56 in American ice hockey by league
1955–56 in Canadian ice hockey by league